Morro Branco can refer to:
Morro Branco, Cape Verde, a low mountain in the west of the island of São Vicente, Cape Verde
Praia de Morro Branco, a beach in Beberibe, Ceará, Brazil